Cowden (or Little Cowden) is a hamlet in the East Riding of Yorkshire, England, in an area known as Holderness. Its name means a hill where charcoal was burnt.

It forms part of the civil parish of Mappleton. Originally, Little Cowden was its own parish, however, the parish church was lost to coastal erosion, so it was moved into the parish of Mappleton.

The Royal Air Force operated a  bombing range on the beach at RAF Cowden between 1959 and 1998. The range was closed due to coastal erosion, which is quite common on the East Riding coast. The erosion regularly reveals buried ordnance which requires the MoD bomb disposal teams to attend and make them safe.

The local HM Coastguard team at Hornsea frequently attend reports of ordnance in the first instance and send the details to the Humber Coastguard Operations Centre and EOD ops centre to decide on the appropriate means of disposal. All ordnance found on the coast should be reported to the Coastguard by dialling 999.

No. 5131(BD) Squadron used to deploy from RAF Wittering in Cambridgeshire to make the old bombs safe but were disbanded in 2019 with the British Army and Royal Navy EOD teams continuing to operate nationally.

References

External links

Villages in the East Riding of Yorkshire
Holderness
Populated coastal places in the East Riding of Yorkshire